Sharad Rao may refer to:

 Sharad Rao (cricketer) (1957–2017), Indian cricketer
 Sharad Rao (judge) (born 1936), Kenyan judge